Progressive overload is a method of strength training that advocates for the gradual increase of the stress placed upon the musculoskeletal and nervous system. The principle of progressive overload suggests that the continual increase in the total workload during training sessions will stimulate muscle growth and strength gain. This improvement in overall performance will, in turn, allow the athlete to keep increasing the intensity of their training sessions.

History 
The method was developed by Thomas Delorme, M.D. while he rehabilitated soldiers after World War II. At the time, most medical doctors believed that weightlifting should be shunned because any type of extreme effort was not desirable for the heart. However, Dr. Thomas Delorme had been active in weight lifting for years and believed that it could have beneficial effects to rehabilitation. In 1944, Delorme was working at the Gardiner General Hospital in Chicago, when he met Sergeant Thaddeus Kawalek, an old army veteran that was struggling with a knee injury. Coincidentally, Kawalek was also a weightlifter and he believed in Delorme's theory about the benefits of the sport. From there, Kawalek became Delorme's first patient in his alternative treatment. The results exceeded expectation. Kawalek recovered much faster than patients in similar conditions and regained full use of his knee. Today, the technique is recognized as a fundamental principle for success in various forms of strength training programs including fitness training, weight lifting, high intensity training and physical therapy programs.

Scientific principles
The goal of strength-training programs is to increase one’s physical strength and performance. This is achieved through resistance training. By placing the exercise musculature under greater-than-normal demand, the body will start a natural adaptation process, improving its capabilities to endure that higher amount of stress. Neuromuscular adaptation will occur first, which will already increase the individual’s strength when lifting. With consistency in the training sessions, what will follow will be an increase in overall muscle mass and the strengthening of connective tissue.

Progressive overload not only stimulates muscle hypertrophy, but it also stimulates the development of stronger and denser bones, ligaments, tendons and cartilage. Progressive overload also incrementally increases blood flow to regions of the body exercised and stimulates more responsive nerve connections between the brain and the muscles involved. In fact, studies suggest that the increase in muscle contraction force, caused by resistance training, happens partially due to an increase in the responsiveness and efficacy of the neural system.

According to recent studies, progressive overload may also be beneficial for the overall health of the individual since it is a good method to increase muscle strength, which was found to decrease the risk of all-cause mortality regardless of muscle mass.

Conversely, decreased use of the muscle results in incremental loss of mass and strength, known as muscular atrophy (see atrophy and muscle atrophy). Sedentary people often lose a pound or more of muscle annually. 

The loss of 10 pounds of muscle per decade is one consequence of a sedentary lifestyle. The adaptive processes of the human body will only respond if continually called upon to exert greater force to meet higher physiological demands.

Methodology
In order to minimize injury and maximize results, the novice begins at a comfortable level of muscular intensity and advances towards overload of the muscles over the course of the exercise program. Progressive overload requires a gradual increase in volume, intensity, frequency or time in order to achieve the targeted goal of the user. In this context, volume and intensity are defined as follows:

 Volume is the total number of repetitions multiplied by the resistance (weight) used to perform each repetition.
 Intensity is the percent value of maximal functional capacity, or expressed as percent repetition maximum.
Frequency is how often a person engages in training activities. Strongly related to training consistency.
Interval duration is the time in between sets of same exercise or between different exercises.

This technique results in greater gains in physical strength and muscular growth, but there are limits. An excess of training stimuli can lead to the problem of overtraining. Overtraining is the decline in training performance over the course of a training program, often accompanied by an increased risk of illness or injury or a decreased desire to exercise. To help avoid this problem, the technique of periodization is applied. Periodization in the context of fitness or strength training programs means scheduling for adequate recovery time between training sessions, and for variety over the course of a long-term program. Motivation can be maintained by avoiding the monotony of repeating identical exercise routines.

Example 
Through experimentation, the athlete should learn what is the maximum number of repetitions he or she can perform, while maintaining good posture, at a specific weight. For example, if they can do 8 repetitions of the bench press exercise with 50 kg, that will be the baseline. From that point on, the athlete should focus on improving one of the categories mentioned in the methodology section: volume, intensity , frequency, or interval duration. In this example, the athlete could do the same number of repetitions but with 52 kg. Eventually, through the body's natural adaptation process, an increase in strength and muscle mass will allow the subject to continue increasing the weight.

References

Further reading

Physical exercise